Gustaaf may refer to:

Gustaaf Van Cauter, (born 1948), former racing cyclist
Gustaaf Deloor (1913–2002), Belgian road racing cyclist
Gustaaf Eeckeman (1918–1975), Belgian football left winger
Gustaaf Adolf van den Bergh van Eysinga (1874–1957), Dutch theologian
Boudewijn Albert Karel Leopold Axel Maria Gustaaf (1930–1993), King of the Belgians from 1951 until his death
Gustaaf Hermans (born 1951), former Belgian cyclist
Gustaaf Bernard Jozef Hiltermann (born 1914), Dutch journalist, jurist, political commentator, publisher, historian
Gustaaf Hulstaert (1900–1990), Belgian missionary in the Belgian Congo from 1925
Gustaaf van Hulstijn (1884–1976), Dutch fencer
Gustaaf Willem van Imhoff (1705–1750), Dutch colonial administrator for the Dutch East India Company
Gustaaf Joos (1923–2004), prelate of the Diocese of Ghent
Julius Gustaaf Arnout Koenders (1886–1957), Surinamese teacher and fervent activist for Sranan Tongo
Gustaaf Lauwereins (born 1941), Belgian judoka
Adolf Gustaaf Lembong (1910–1950), Indonesian military officer involved in guerrilla warfare against Japan in the Philippines during World War II
Gustaaf Adolf Maengkom (1907–1984), former Indonesian Minister of Justice in the Djuanda Cabinet and Indonesian ambassador to Poland
Gustaaf Adolf Frederik Molengraaff (1860–1942), Dutch geologist, biologist and explorer
Gustaaf Martinus Oosterling (1873–1928), early Surinamese photographer
Gustaaf Pelsmaecker or Auguste Pelsmaeker (1899–1976), Belgian footballer
Gustaaf Van Roosbroeck (born 1948), Belgian professional road bicycle racer
Gustaaf Sap or Gustave Sap (1886–1940), Belgian politician and minister for the Catholic Party
Gustaaf Schlegel (1840–1903), Dutch sinologist and field naturalist
Gustaaf Segers (1848–1930), Flemish writer, Dutch and German teacher and Vondel scholar
Gustaaf Van Slembrouck (1902–1968), Belgian professional cyclist from 1926 to 1934, nicknamed 'Den Staf'
Gustaaf De Smet (1935–2020), Belgian cyclist
Gustaaf Sorel (1905–1981), Belgian painter and draughtsman
Gustaaf Uhlenbeek (born 1970), Dutch former footballer
Gustaaf Wappers (1803–1874), Belgian painter

See also
Gustav (disambiguation)
Gustavia (disambiguation)
Gustavo
Gustov